General  was a Japanese imperial prince, a career officer in the Imperial Japanese Army and the 30th Prime Minister of Japan from 17 August 1945 to 9 October 1945, a period of 54 days. An uncle-in-law of Emperor Shōwa twice over, Prince Higashikuni was the only member of the Japanese imperial family to head a cabinet and was the last general officer of the Imperial Japanese military to become Prime Minister. He was the founder of the Chiba Institute of Technology. He was one of the longest-lived members of any royal family.

Early life
Prince Naruhiko was born on 3 December 1887 in Kyoto, the ninth son of Prince Kuni Asahiko (Kuni no miya Asahiko Shinnō) and the court lady Terao Utako. His father, Prince Asahiko, was a son of Prince Fushimi Kuniie (Fushimi no miya Kuniie Shinnō), the twentieth head of the Fushimi-no-miya, the oldest of the sesshu shinnōke or cadet branches of the imperial dynasty from whom an emperor might be chosen in default of a direct heir. Prince Naruhiko was a half-brother of Prince Kuni Kuniyoshi, the father of the future Empress Kōjun, the wife of Emperor Shōwa. His other half-brothers, Prince Asaka Yasuhiko, Prince Nashimoto Morimasa, and Prince Kaya Kuninori, all formed new branches of the imperial family (ōke) during the Meiji period.

Marriage and family
Emperor Meiji granted Prince Naruhiko the title Higashikuni-no-miya and permission to start a new branch of the imperial family on 3 November 1906. Prince Naruhiko married the ninth daughter of Emperor Meiji, Princess Toshiko (11 May 1896 – 5 March 1978), on 18 May 1915. The couple had four sons.

; married Princess Shigeko, the eldest daughter of Emperor Shōwa and Empress Kōjun.
; died in the Great Kantō earthquake.
; renounced imperial title and created Marquis Awata Akitsune, 1940
; renounced imperial title and created Count Tarama Toshihiko, 1943; relocated to Lins, São Paulo, Brazil, 1950.

Military career 

Prince Higashikuni Naruhiko was a career officer in the Imperial Japanese Army. In 1908, he graduated from the Imperial Japanese Army Academy as a second lieutenant, was promoted to lieutenant in 1910 and to captain in 1913. In 1914, he graduated from the Army War College. He was commissioned a captain in the 29th Infantry Brigade, and promoted to major in the IJA 7th Division in 1915.

Prince Higashikuni then studied military tactics at the École Spéciale Militaire de Saint-Cyr and École Polytechnique in Paris France, from 1920 to 1926, during which time he was promoted to lieutenant-colonel in 1920 and to colonel in 1926. Always somewhat of a rebel, Prince Higashikuni's behavior in Paris scandalized the Imperial Court. He had a French mistress, enjoyed fast cars and high living. He left his wife and children in Japan, and the death of his second son did not prompt his return. In 1926, the Imperial Household Ministry dispatched a chamberlain to Paris to collect him.

Upon his return to Japan, he was assigned to the Imperial Japanese Army General Staff Headquarters. Promoted to major-general in August 1930 and appointed commander of the 5th Infantry Brigade (1930–1934), he was promoted to lieutenant-general in August 1934 and given command of the IJA 4th Division (1934–1937). After the start of the Second Sino-Japanese War, he headed the Imperial Japanese Army Air Service (1937–1938), and the IJA 2nd Army stationed in China from 1938–1939. He was promoted to general in August 1939.

According to a memo discovered by historian Yoshiaki Yoshimi, Prince Higashikuni authorized the use of poison gas against the Chinese on 16 August 1938.
Prince Higashikuni encouraged and enabled human experiments, providing advice, money, men and equipment. He personally witnessed human experiments conducted by the military physicians during his tours in Manchukuo. 

On 13 May 1939 the Imperial General Headquarters authorized the use of poison gas to Japanese Northern China Area Army（大陸指第四百五十二号). Only riot control agents were used till then. Prince Higashikuni moved to the post at home dated 4 January 1939. Promoted to full general, The prince was awarded the Order of the Golden Kite, 1st Class in 1940. 

Before Japan entered the Second World War, on 15 October 1941, outgoing Prime Minister Fumimaro Konoe proposed Prince Higashikuni to Emperor Shōwa as his successor for prime minister. Konoe believed that only a member of the Imperial Family with a distinguished military background could restrain the pro-war faction led by Generals Hajime Sugiyama, Hideki Tōjō, and Akira Mutō. Prince Higashikuni was also the choice of both Chief of Staffs of the Army and the Navy.

However, both Emperor Shōwa and the Lord Privy Seal, Kido Kōichi, believed that it would be inappropriate for a member of the Imperial Family to serve in that position, as he could be blamed for anything which went wrong in the war. Thus, two days later, the Emperor chose General Hideki Tōjō as Prime Minister. In 1946, he explained this decision: "I actually thought Prince Higashikuni suitable as Chief of Staff of the Army; but I think the appointment of a member of the Imperial house to a political office must be considered very carefully. Above all, in time of peace this is fine, but when there is a fear that there may even be a war, then more importantly, considering the welfare of the imperial house, I wonder about the wisdom of a member of the Imperial family serving [as prime minister]."

Six weeks later, Japan attacked Pearl Harbor. During the early stages of the Pacific War, Prince Higashikuni served as commander of the General Defense Command from 1941 to 1944.

Prince Higashikuni remained steadfast in his opposition to the war with the Allied powers, and was part of the conspiracy (with Prince Asaka, Prince Takamatsu, and former Prime Minister Konoe) which finally ousted Tōjō in July 1944 following the fall of Saipan to American forces. The American researchers with SCAP also found out that he had planned towards the end of the war to depose Emperor Shōwa, placing the Crown Prince Akihito on the throne instead, governing the country with himself as regent.

Prime Minister

After the course of the war turned against Japan, and the decision was made to accept the Potsdam Declaration, Emperor Shōwa appointed Prince Higashikuni to the position of prime minister on 16 August 1945, replacing Admiral Kantarō Suzuki. The mission of the Higashikuni cabinet was twofold: first, to ensure the orderly cessation of hostilities and demobilization of the Japanese armed forces; and second, to reassure the Japanese people that the imperial institution remained secure. Prince Higashikuni resigned in October over a dispute with the American occupation forces over the repeal of the 1925 Peace Preservation Law. This law was largely intended to prevent the spread of Communism to Japan.

Life after resignation
On 27 February 1946, Prince Higashikuni gave an interview to the Yomiuri-Hōchi newspaper in which he claimed that many members of the imperial family had approved Emperor Shōwa's abdication, with Prince Takamatsu serving as regent until Crown Prince Akihito came of age. In the government, only Prime Minister Kijūrō Shidehara and the Imperial Household Minister opposed this. On 4 March 1946, Higashikuni gave a similar interview to the Associated Press (reported in The New York Times) indicating that he had proposed to the Emperor possible dates for abdication.
 
In 1946, Prince Higashikuni asked the emperor for permission to renounce his membership in the Imperial Family and become a commoner. The emperor denied the request. However, along with other members of the Imperial branch families (shinnōke and ōke), Prince Higashikuni lost his title and most of his wealth as a result of the American occupation’s abolition of the princely houses on 17 October 1947.

As a private citizen, Higashikuni operated several unsuccessful retail enterprises (including a provisions store, second-hand goods store, and dressmaker's shop). He even created his own new Zen Buddhism-based religious sect, the Higashikuni-kyo, which was subsequently banned by the American occupation authorities.

The former prince became the honorary chairman of the International Martial Arts Federation (IMAF) in 1957, and honorary president of several other organizations.

In 1958, Higashikuni published his wartime journals under the title, Ichi Kozoku no Senso Nikki (or The War Diary of a Member of the Imperial Family). He published his autobiographical memoirs, Higashikuni Nikki, in 1968.

Death and legacy
Higashikuni is today mainly remembered as Japan's first postwar prime minister. He was one of the longest-lived prime ministers of all time, along with Antoine Pinay, Willem Drees and Christopher Hornsrud, and at his death was the last surviving full general of the Imperial Japanese Army. From 14 May 1988, when former Netherlands Prime Minister Willem Drees died, until his own death, Higashikuni was the world's oldest living former head of government.

Footnotes

Gallery

References
 Dower, John W. Embracing Defeat: Japan in the Wake of World War II. W. W. Norton & Company (2000). 
 Frank, Richard B. Downfall: The End of the Imperial Japanese Empire. Penguin (Non-Classics); Reissue edition (2001). 
 Manchester, William. American Caesar: Douglas MacArthur 1880–1964. Little, Brown and Company (1978). 
 Spector, Ronald. Eagle Against the Sun: The American War With Japan. Vintage; Vintage edition (1985). 
 Toland, John. The Rising Sun: The Decline and Fall of the Japanese Empire, 1936–1945. Modern Library; Reprint edition (2003). 

|-

1887 births
1990 deaths
20th-century prime ministers of Japan
People from Kyoto
Prime Ministers of Japan
Imperial Japanese Army generals of World War II
Japanese princes
Higashikuni-no-miya
Japanese centenarians
Japanese generals
Japanese military personnel of World War II
Ministers of the Imperial Japanese Army
Members of the House of Peers (Japan)
Men centenarians
Recipients of the Order of the Golden Kite
Recipients of the Order of the Paulownia Flowers
École Spéciale Militaire de Saint-Cyr alumni